The Amelia Peabody series of historical mystery novels is written by Elizabeth Peters, set in Victorian Egypt among a family of eccentric archaeologists.

Note that, as with most character lists, the descriptions herein necessarily contain numerous spoilers.

Entirely fictional

The Emerson family 
Amelia Peabody Emerson  The matriarch, sleuth, and fervent pyramidophile. Nicknamed "Sitt Hakim" ("Lady Doctor").
Professor Radcliffe Emerson  Amelia's husband, "The greatest Egyptologist of this or any other era." Nicknamed "Abu Shitaim" ("Father of Curses").
Walter Peabody "Ramses" Emerson  Amelia and Radcliffe's only child, first described as "catastrophically precocious" and later dubbed "Akhu el-Efreet" ("Brother of Demons"). 
Nefret Emerson  Daughter of Willoughby Forth.  Raised until the age of 13 in a lost Meroitic civilization, where she and her father were forced to remain.  Adopted by the Emersons and later married to Ramses; nicknamed "Nur Misur" (Light of Egypt).  First appears in The Last Camel Died at Noon.
Walter Emerson  Emerson's younger brother, the world-famous philologist.
Evelyn Forbes Emerson Amelia's dearest friend, who has a heart of gold and nerves of steel.  Wife of Walter the elder.
Amelia "Lia" Emerson Todros  Evelyn's daughter, named for Amelia Peabody, who defies convention to marry David Todros (in The Falcon at the Portal).
David Todros  Abdullah's grandson, adopted by Walter and Evelyn. A natural artist and Ramses' partner in mischief, David first appears in The Hippopotamus Pool.
James Peabody  Amelia's eldest and least favorite brother, father of Percy and Violet. Referred to in Crocodile on the Sandbank, first seen in Deeds of the Disturber. 
Percival "Percy" Peabody  Decidedly unpleasant nephew of Amelia and son of James.  First seen in Deeds of the Disturber; killed off in He Shall Thunder in the Sky.
Sennia Emerson  Percy's illegitimate daughter by a Cairo prostitute, abandoned by her father and later used by him in an attempt to discredit Ramses. She is adopted by the Emersons. Called "Little Bird." First appears in The Falcon at the Portal.
Seth Emerson, a.k.a. Sethos Illegitimate half-brother of Professor Radcliffe Emerson.  Alternately known as "The Master Criminal." First appeared in The Mummy Case. Discovered to be related to Emerson in He Shall Thunder in the Sky. Father of Maryam (Molly)  (see also Enemies)
Charlotte "Charla" Emerson  Ramses' and Nefret's daughter, named for Amelia's mother. Twin sister of David John.
David John "Davy" Emerson  Ramses' and Nefret's son, named for David Todros and Evelyn and Walter's son, John, who died in the First World War. Twin brother of Charlotte.
Abdullah "Dolly" Todros  David's and Lia's son, named for David's grandfather. Older brother of Evelyn.
Evelyn "Evvie" Todros  David's and Lia's daughter, named for Lia's mother.  Nicknamed Sekhmet for her "lion-colored mane of hair and her explosive temper."  Younger sister of Abdullah.

The Emersons' staff and work crew

Abdullah ibn Hassan al Wahhab  The Emersons' loyal reis (foreman), who leads the excavations with Emerson. Devoted to Emerson, and initially resentful of Amelia ("Every year, another dead body!"), he eventually becomes just as devoted to her, and dies heroically defending her life (The Ape Who Guards the Balance). Reappears to Amelia in clairvoyant dreams; David and Lia's first child is named for him.
Selim  Abdullah's youngest son, friend of Ramses, with a technical mind and an eye for the ladies. When he grows up, he takes his father, Abdullah's, place as reis. Has two wives, Rabia and Taghrid.
Daoud  Abdullah's nephew, a giant of a man whose simple observations help solve mysteries and protect his friends. He adores Lia, David's wife, and his faith in Amelia's abilities verges on religious awe.
Fatima  (First introduced in "The Ape Who Guard's the Balance") Abdullah's daughter-in-law, the widow of one of his deceased sons. After her husband dies, she asks Amelia for a position of independence, and becomes the Emersons' dedicated housekeeper in Egypt, and enjoys learning to read and write.
Kadija  Daoud's wife. Born of a Nubian mother, whose dark coloring she shares, and stronger than many men. Keeps the secret recipe for the famous "green ointment" prescribed as a cure-all by all members of Abdullah's family.
 Gargery  The Emersons' butler. Accompanies the Emersons on some of their later expeditions, acting as Sennia's bodyguard. Has been known to wield a cudgel to defend his employers.
 Rose  The Emersons' housekeeper in Kent, completely devoted to Ramses.
 Bassima  Sennia's Nanny.  First appeared in The Falcon at the Portal.

Cats
Bastet  The matriarch of the long line of companions; she and Ramses have a deep bond with one another. After her death at a ripe old age (noted in Seeing a Large Cat), it will take Ramses years before he even considers accepting another feline companion. Almost always referred to as 'the cat Bastet'.  First appears in The Curse of the Pharaohs. 
Anubis   Originally belonged to the villainous Vincey but eventually bonds with Emerson, and fathers a large brood with Bastet.  First appears in The Snake, the Crocodile, and the Dog.
Sekhmet   Called "the furry blob" by Ramses, she later defects to live a life of luxury with the Vandergelts.  First appears in Seeing a Large Cat.
Horus   Bonds originally with Nefret but later defects to Sennia.  They are the only two people he will tolerate.  First appears in The Ape Who Guards the Balance.
Seshat  First appears in The Falcon at the Portal; prefers Ramses.
The Great Cat of Re   Brought to the family, as a small kitten, by Horus; loyal to Ramses.  Makes it plain he refuses to commute back and forth to England and remains resident at the Emerson's house at Thebes.  First appears in The Golden One.

Horses
Risha  (Arabic, "feather") Silver-gray stallion, a gift to Ramses from a sheik friend of the Emersons, who fathers a large family of mounts for the rest of the family.
Asfur  (Arabic, "bird") Mare, a gift to David from the same sheik.
Moonlight  Mare, a daughter of Risha and Asfur, belongs to Nefret.
Melusine Filly, appears in Children of the Storm

Dogs

Narmer   A "large, homely yellow dog", adopted by Nefret in The Falcon at the Portal.  He initially barks at everything, including scorpions and spiders, but Nefret has hopes of training him to be a watchdog.  His name is that of the first king of Upper and Lower Egypt
Amira   A "large tawny beast" which Daoud acquires at Ramses' request in The Serpent on the Crown to guard against unwanted visitors and to protect Charla and David John.  Enormous but extremely submissive. Her name is Arabic for "princess."

Friends
Cyrus Vandergelt  Courtly American millionaire who longs for a rich find but finds loyal friends instead. First appears in The Curse of the Pharaohs.
Katherine Whitney-Jones Vandergelt  A schoolteacher, widowed after an unhappy marriage, who becomes a semi-fraudulent spiritual medium to support her two children. After her unmasking in Egypt, she and Cyrus fall in love. First appears in Seeing a Large Cat.
Bertie Vandergelt  Katherine Vandergelt's son by her first marriage, whom Cyrus later adopts and who comes to Egypt after being wounded and discharged during World War I; he proves invaluable both as an ally and an excavator. First appears in Lord of the Silent.
Anna Vandergelt  Katherine Vandergelt's daughter by her first marriage, whom Cyrus later adopts and who expresses interest in becoming a nurse at the outbreak of war. First appears in He Shall Thunder in the Sky.
Kevin O'Connell  An Irish reporter for the London Daily Yell, in whom "the journalist and the gentleman are always at war." He dogs the Emersons' steps for a story, but also pitches in when the crime-fighting gets tough. First appears in The Curse of the Pharaohs.
Margaret Minton  A female reporter (one of the few), with even fewer scruples than O'Connell. Bears a striking resemblance to Amelia. First appears in Deeds of the Disturber as O'Connell's professional rival, and subsequently develops a crush on Radcliffe Emerson. Later marries Seth Emerson.
Karl von Bork  A young German archaeologist who first appears in The Curse of the Pharaohs, marries the daughter of one of the suspects, and appears periodically in other stories.
Donald Fraser  Young English nobleman who first appears in Lion in the Valley using the alias "Nemo", an upright man who loses himself in the Cairo underground while searching for his scoundrel brother.  He is rescued by the Emersons, and marries Enid Debenham, his childhood sweetheart. Reappears in Seeing a Large Cat.
Enid Debenham Fraser  Young Englishwoman who first appears in Lion in the Valley masquerading as a female archaeologist while searching Egypt for Donald. Begins a friendship with Ramses when he is still a child. Reappears in Seeing a Large Cat.
Jumana  A young Egyptian woman who aspires to be an archaeologist, and whom the Emersons strive to help achieve her goal in spite of others' prejudices. First appears in Lord of the Silent. As of the end of Tomb of the Golden Bird, she and Bertie are engaged.  Daughter of Abdullah's brother Yusuf; sister of Jamil.
Maryam  Sethos's daughter by Bertha. First appears in He Shall Thunder in the Sky using the pseudonym Melinda "Molly" Hamilton,  with a crush on Ramses.  Manipulated by her half-sister in Children of the Storm to aid in a scheme of robbery and revenge.
 Sir Edward Washington  English aristocrat and photographer. First appears in The Hippopotamus Pool, employed by the Emersons as their staff photographer, and one of  Nefret's many admirers.  Re-appears in The Ape Who Guards the Balance, and The Golden One. He is eventually revealed to be one of Sethos's most trusted lieutenants.
 The Honourable Algernon Bracegirdle-Boisdragon, aka "Smith"  Ramses's, and later Sethos's sometime case-officer for British Intelligence.
 Ibrahim El-Gharbi  Kingpin of the prostitution houses of Cairo, known for his flamboyant transvestism.  Though the Emersons despise his profession, he is often a useful source of information and aid in tight spots.  First appears in He Shall Thunder in the Sky.  In Children of the Storm provides a key clue when Peabody consults him in his forced exile.

Enemies
Sethos  Nom de crime of the shadowy "Master Criminal" first encountered in The Mummy Case, who harbors a desire to possess Amelia. Although he is included here under "Enemies", Sethos and the Emerson clan declare a sort of truce, when it is revealed that Sethos is Emerson's illegitimate half brother in He Shall Thunder in the Sky.  He is a master of disguise, able to take on almost any personality. He specializes in stealing and selling artifacts, though eventually he uses these talents as an agent of British intelligence. Father of Maryam (Molly).
 Bertha   Daughter of a German father and an Egyptian mother, she first appears in The Snake, the Crocodile, and the Dog as a henchwoman of the villainous Vincey, but later founds her own criminal gang, composed mostly of women. A formidable foe of the Emersons, she particularly hates Amelia, possibly in jealousy over Radcliffe and Sethos.  After working briefly with Sethos, she becomes independent again. She is killed (The Ape Who Guards the Balance) after trying to assassinate Amelia. Mother of Maryam (Molly) and Justin.
Matilda  Bertha's bodyguard and right hand. Intelligent, ruthless, and terrifyingly strong.
"Justin" Bertha's daughter by Vincey, aka Schlange, a prostitute and later a criminal mastermind in her own right. Adept at disguise; appears in Children of the Storm as a young, disturbed boy.  Never reveals her true name.  Dies when she blows up her dahabeeyah.
Jamil  Abdullah's nephew and Jumana's brother. Cunning but volatile. First appears in Lord of the Silent; dies in The Golden One.

Based on real persons

Archaeologists
Edward R. Ayrton
James Henry Breasted
Wallis Budge
Émile Brugsch
Harry Burton
James Burton
Lord Carnarvon
Howard Carter
Theodore M. Davis
Pierre Lacau
Gaston Maspero
Édouard Naville
William Flinders Petrie
James Quibell
Annie Quibell
George Andrew Reisner
Archibald Sayce
Arthur Weigall
Herbert E. Winlock
Leonard Woolley

Politicians and military officers
Lord and Lady Allenby
Lord Edward Cecil
Evelyn Baring
General Philip Chetwode
Herbert Kitchener
T. E. Lawrence
Sir John Maxwell
Baroness Emma Orczy
Christabel Pankhurst
Emmeline Pankhurst

Characters
Amelia Peabody